Madalena Alberto is a Portuguese actress, singer and composer who has developed her career in the West End. Alberto received rave reviews for her role as Eva Perón in Evita in the West End (16 September - 1 November 2014), where the show arrived after it's UK Tour. Alberto played the role of Fantine in the 25th Anniversary production of Les Misérables.

Career 

Her professional debut was in Aladdin at the Old Vic, London, with Sir Ian McKellen (2005). She has developed her career mainly in Musical Theatre performing the roles of Lucy in The Threepenny Opera (Lisbon, 2005), Carmen Diaz in Fame (UK Tour, 2007) and Hunyak in Chicago (Kuala Lumpur, 2007). Alberto was part of the original cast of the West End production of Zorro the Musical (Garrick Theatre, 2008), playing the role of Luisa.

In Summer 2009 Alberto played the role of Sam in Christopher Hamilton's new musical Over the Threshold at the Edinburgh Festival. The show transferred to the Jermyn Street Theatre, London, from 22 September to 3 October 2009. From December 2009 to October 2010 she played the role of Fantine in the acclaimed 25th Anniversary production of Les Misérables, that opened at the Wales Millennium Centre in Cardiff on 22 December 2009 and ended at the Barbican Theatre, London on 2 October 2010. She also took part of the O2 Arena concert of Les Misérables.

Alberto played the role of Sonia in Stephen Schwartz's Godspell, which ran at the Union Theatre, London from 13 April to 7 May 2011 directed by Michael Strassen. She also played the role of Lucy in the first London production of Frank Wildhorn's JEKYLL AND HYDE produced by Morphic Graffiti, that ran at the Union Theatre from 16 May to 16 June 2012.

In March–April 2013 Alberto played the role of Édith Piaf in Pam Gems' Piaf, at Leicester's Curve Theatre directed by Paul Kerrison.

Alberto starred as Eva Perón in the 2013–2014 UK tour of Evita alongside Marti Pellow as Che. Produced by Bill Kenwright, the tour opened at London's New Wimbledon Theatre on 15 May. The first length of the tour concluded in Peterborough on 9 November 2013. The second length of this UK Tour, opened in Oxford on 22 January 2014, and ended in Aylesbury on 19 July 2014. Afterwards, Evita with Mark Powell replacing Marti Pellow, ran at the Kursaal Oostende in Belgium from 29 July to 10 August 2014. Alberto received rave reviews for this role.

On 27 June 2014 it was announced that Evita was due to open on Tuesday 16 September 2014 at the recently refurbished Dominion Theatre for 55 performances only starring Marti Pellow and Alberto. After a successful run in the West End, receiving rave reviews for her role, Alberto was nominated as Best Actress in a Musical in the 15th Annual WhatsOnStage Awards.

Alberto joined the cast of The Vote, a play by James Graham at London's Donmar Warehouse alongside Judi Dench, Mark Gatiss, Catherine Tate. The play, directed by Josie Rourke, run from 24 April 2015 to 7 May 2015. On 7 May the play was broadcast live on More4 from the Donmar stage.

Madalena made her solo concert debut in London Don't Cry For Me on 25 July 2015, at St. James Studio, with Alfonso Casado as MD, and with Sophie Evans, Ceilli O’Connor, Simon Bailey, Jade Anouka and Sam Cassidy as guest artists.

In October 2015 Madalena Alberto joined the cast of Andrew Lloyd Webber's Cats at the London Palladium, performing the role of Grizabella. Cats ran at the London Palladium from 23 October 2015 to 2 January 2016.

Alberto has also taken part in some musical theatre concerts in London, such as the 4th and the 2nd Tim Williams Awards at the Cochrane Theatre (2009 and 2011); the Whatsonstage Awards Concert (2011), the Giggin For Good concert at the Actors Church in Convent Garden (2011), the Mercury Musical Developments 20th Anniversary Gala Concert at West End's Novello Theatre (2012), Scott Alan's concert at the St James Theatre (3 May 2015) and a benefit concert of Elegies for Angels, Punks and Raging Queens at The Criterion Theatre (31 May 2015). In 2015 she also performed in West End Bares Concert (20 Sept.), in Scott Alan's concert at The Hippodrome (12 Sep.), in 'An Evening with Tim Rice and Friends' at the Sage Gateshead Theatre (8 Oct.2015), and in 'Broadway by the Bay' at the Cardiff Millennium Center (23-25 Oct); and performed as guest star in Ceilli O'Connor and Stewart Matthew Price solo concerts in London.

Alberto performed alongside Ricardo Afonso and Sofia Escobar at the Golden Globe Awards in Portugal on 29 May 2011.

Alberto made her Spanish debut in Barcelona on 3 December 2012, performing in an intimate concert at La Cova del Drac with Nina and Daniel Angles as special guests. She came back to Barcelona in 2015, performing at L'Auditori (Sala Alicia Larrocha) on 24 March with Joan Tena, Lucy Lummis and Anna Mateo as special guests.

She performed in the gala concert 'O Melhor dos Musicais no Coliseu' at the Coliseu dos Recreios in Lisbon, alongside Robyn North, John Owen-Jones and Henrique Feist on 22 February 2013 under the musical direction of Nuno Feist. This concert took place again on 20 November 2014 with Sofia Escobar replacing Robyn North.

Alberto combines her work as an actress with her career as a composer and performing her own songs. She released Foreign Sketches - Live Studio Recording - her first solo album - in March 2011; and on 5 September 2012 she released the EP Heart Condition, her first collaboration with other musicians. In her songs Alberto expresses universal feelings about emancipation, dreams, drugs, sex, betrayal and jealousy. She performs her music in different London venues such as The 100 Club, The Regal Room, The Troubador, Parker McMillan or Ryan's Bar. Alberto has also offered different concerts in Lisbon, her hometown, in December 2011 (Vinyl, Braço de Prata) and in April 2012 (Vinyl).

Alberto has also taken part of different workshops in London, playing the title role in Craig Adams's THÉRÈSE RAQUIN, A-Z of Mrs P (written by Gwyneth Herbert) and Desperately Seeking Susan (dir. Angus Jackson).

Recordings include Les Misérables Live!– The 2010 Cast album, Les Misérables 25th Anniversary Concert at the O2 CD and DVD, and The Postman and the Poet and One Touch of Venus released by Jay Records. Alberto can also be heard at John Owen-Jones album Rise released in March 2015. In March 2014 Alberto released her solo album Don’t Cry For Me, released by BK Records, performing musical theatre classics.

Madalena Alberto offered a concert at London's St James Studio on 25 July 2015 accompanied by Alfonso Casado on the piano. In this intimate evening Madalena performed songs from shows that have marked her career – including Evita, Les Misérables and Piaf – as well as her own compositions.

She performed the role of Carrie in Jeff Wayne's The War of the Worlds musical at the Dominion Theatre, in London's West End, from 8 February to 30 April 2016.

Then she played the role of Tina McCoy in the return of Michael Strassen's production of The Fix at the Union Theatre's new venue, in London, from 13 July until 6 August 2016.

Madalena performed the role of Nina in The Autumn Garden, a play by Lillian Hellman directed by Anthony Biggs, at the Jermyn Street Theatre, in London, from 5th until 29 October 2016.

Alberto reprised her role as Eva Perón in Evita in 2018, for the UK and world tour. Notable UK venues included the Palace Theatre, Manchester, King's Theatre, Glasgow and Newcastle Theatre Royal. Alberto also played in Dubai, Luxembourg and Italy as part of the tour, on 2 June 2018, Alberto gave her final performance as Eva Perón.

References

External links 
 
 
todoMUSICALES article regarding MMD Concert Gala
 Madalena Alberto's Q&A
 An interview with Madalena Alberto talking about LES MISÉRABLES (Sept. 2010)
 Madalena Alberto releases her debut album ‘Foreign Sketches - Live Studio Recording’ 
 Tim Rogers and Madalena Alberto uncover the bowels of JEKYLL AND HYDE’ 
 West End Star Madalena Alberto to Make Spanish Debut at Barcelona's La Cova del Drac, 3 Dec 

Year of birth missing (living people)
Living people
Actresses from Lisbon
Portuguese expatriates in the United Kingdom
Portuguese stage actresses
Actresses from London
Portuguese musical theatre actors
Place of birth missing (living people)